"Quédate" is a song by Dominican singer Henry Santos . It was released on February 19, 2016, and served as the second single for his third album The Third (2016). The music video was released on June 30, 2016.

Charts

References

2016 songs
2016 singles
Henry Santos songs